Andrew Bowen is an American actor and comedian. He was a cast member on Mad TV and voices Johnny Cage in Mortal Kombat.

Life
Bowen was born in Boston and raised in Vermont. After watching the film Grease at the age of six, he told his parents that he wanted to be "like John Travolta when he grew up". His mother considered enrolling him in dance class, but decided against it. The following year, he performed as the lead in his first play titled Once Upon a Rhyme. He continued studying ballet and modern jazz for eight years and was involved in local theater throughout high school.

During the summer following his high school graduation, Bowen acquired an agent in New York City, then moved to Los Angeles. His first film role would have been as Kathryn Erbe's love interest in What About Bob? (1991). He received a letter from director Frank Oz before the film's release informing him that his role had ended up on the cutting room floor. He worked in various part-time jobs, such as commercials and small roles on television, while also taking screenwriting courses at the University of Southern California.

A father of three, Bowen is a devoted family man. His son, Seth Lucas Bowen appeared in an episode of CBS series Bad Teacher.

Career
In 1995, Bowen was hired to play the lead role in Fox Hunt, a live-action interactive video game from Capcom. His character, Jack Fremont, is a comedic twist on a "James Bond" type of character. Fox Hunt was later developed as a potential television series. Bowen's performance in the game was also noticed by executives at Warner Bros., who signed him to a talent development deal.

While waiting for the Fox Hunt pilot to be filmed, Bowen wrote, directed, and financed a short film called Lone Defender. The film was intended as an audition for the role of Peter Parker in a Spider-Man movie that James Cameron was slated to direct. The Spider-Man production encountered legal problems by the time Bowen finished Lone Defender, but the process of making it had catalyzed Bowen's desire to direct films. He quickly wrote a spec script for a film called Along the Way and began looking for a producer.

Bowen eventually filmed the pilot for Fox Hunt, but the show was not picked up. Instead, he joined the cast of Fox's MADtv later that year and was quickly called one of the new talents to watch by TV Guide. Despite his success, Bowen left the show after one season, and with the help of his father he raised enough money to start principal photography for Along the Way (aka The Haven]. He gained over 40 pounds in order to play the hulking character "Jocko" in the film. Scott Weinberg wrote, "Andrew Bowen (formerly of the underrated MADtv) is stunningly strong as Jocko, creating a character that on the surface seems like little more than an affable giant, yet the actor brings a fierce sense of loyalty, a goofy sense of humor, and an overall air of desperate sadness to this role. He delivers easily one of the best 'unknown' performances I've seen in years."

While Bowen raised the money he couldn't finish his film, he continued acting, landing recurring roles on ER and Reno 911! as well as guest roles on programs such as CSI: NY, Las Vegas, JAG, Charmed. He also appeared in movies such as Ivan Reitman's Evolution (2001) and starred in several television pilots, including Breadwinners for producers Gale Anne Hurd and Steven Tao. In addition, Bowen has lent his voice to the video games Ice Age: The Meltdown, Rise of Nations, The Matrix: Path of Neo, Mortal Kombat X, Mortal Kombat 11, and others.

He appeared in the critically acclaimed film series The Work and the Glory (Parts II and III), playing Brigham Young, Big Bad Wolf for Universal Studios, and the vampire film Immortally Yours. He also had a small role in the Joss Whedon television series Dollhouse and appeared in Star Stories (the American version of a British comedy series), Conjurer with John Schneider and Maxine Bahns, and the independent feature Butterfly Dreaming for director Rufus Sam Williams. He has also filmed commercials for products including Bud Light, Circuit City, Chrysler, Touchstone Energy Cooperatives, and Diet Coke.

Celebrity impressions on Mad TV

 Morey Amsterdam
 Yasser Arafat
 Christian Bale
 Garth Brooks
 Nicolas Cage
 Matt Damon
 James Doohan
 Michael Flatley
 Scott Foley
 Donny Osmond
 Bill Paxton
 Brad Pitt
 Jason Priestley
 Keanu Reeves
 Seann William Scott
 Charlie Sheen
 Christian Slater
 Kenneth Starr
 Jean-Claude Van Damme
 Christopher Walken

Filmography

Film

Television

Video games

References

External links
 

Living people
Male actors from Boston
American impressionists (entertainers)
American male film actors
American male television actors
American male video game actors
American male voice actors
American male comedians
American sketch comedians
Comedians from Massachusetts
21st-century American comedians
Year of birth missing (living people)